Rusizi National Park is a national park in Burundi, next to the Rusizi River.
It is 15 km north of the city of Bujumbura and home to hippopotamuses and sitatungas. Gustave, a Nile crocodile, is rumored to have killed 300 people here.

References

External links

National parks of Burundi
Ramsar sites in Burundi
Albertine Rift montane forests